Tobi Haslett is an American critic and writer. He has written about art, film, and literature for n+1, The New Yorker, Artforum, The Village Voice, and other publications. He lives and works in New York City.

Work 
Haslett has written reviews, catalog essays, and introductions to novels. He has written reviews for The Collected Essays of Elizabeth Hardwick, Norman Podhoretz's Making It, and The Image Book, directed by Jean-Luc Godard. For Artforum's special issue titled The Year in Monsters, Haslett wrote about Omarosa Manigault Newman's third book, Unhinged: An Insider’s Account of the Trump White House.

Haslett wrote the introduction to Gary Indiana's re-released debut novel, Horse Crazy, which follows a semi-autobiographical tale of a New York City art critic vying for the attention and affection of an addict-riddled artist. He wrote on Martin Puryear's sculptures that were included in the United States’ official contribution to the 2019 Venice Biennale.

In 2019, Hannah Black, Ciarán Finlayson, and Haslett released a statement in Artforum titled The Tear Gas Biennial, decrying the involvement of Warren Kanders, co-chair of the board of the Whitney Museum, and his "toxic philanthropy." Although Kanders has donated an estimated $10 million to the museum, the source of his fortune is derived from Safariland LLC, a company that manufactures riot gear, tear gas, and other chemical weapons used by the police and the military to enforce violent order. As of 1925, the Geneva Convention has outlawed the use of tear gas in all international military conflict, however, the tear gas fired at peaceful protesters and civilians by the police and military during the George Floyd protests as well as migrants on the US-Mexico border is the same brand of tear gas manufactured by Defense Technology, a subsidy of Safariland. A wave of artists from the Biennial, including Korakrit Arunanondchai, Meriem Bennani, Nicole Eisenman and Nicholas Galanin, demanded immediate removal of their work from the Biennial within hours after the essay was published. After mounting pressure from additional artists, critics, and patrons urging the public to boycott the show, Kanders stepped down from his leadership position at the museum. The essay was instrumental in Kanders resignation as well as the museum cutting ties with Kanders financial endowments that are directly connected to the promotion and use of military weaponry and violence during peaceful social unrest.

Later that year, Haslett published an essay criticizing Thomas Chatterton Williams's book, Self-Portrait in Black and White: Unlearning Race, for its confusing and ambivalent argument for a post-racial society. Haslett argues that at both the institutional level as well as the professional level, writers and certain cultural intellectuals rely too heavily on incoherence instead of irony, modesty, discernment, ambivalence, or other stylistic choices. Haslett additionally takes issue with Williams being an unreliable storyteller: Williams claims his own “black life” is a singular narrative, and yet he refuses to identify with the black collective and wages a morality test against hip-hop culture in favor of reading books. Haslett asks, “Why not both?” Williams wrote a response to the criticism in Harper's stating that there needs to exist a complicated understanding and practice of liberalism such that claiming, as an example, that former President Barack Obama was a center-right moderate would be anachronistic.

References

African-American writers
American literary critics
American art critics
Living people
Year of birth missing (living people)
21st-century African-American people